Zack Piontek (born 27 January 1991) is a South African judoka.

He competed at the 2016 Summer Olympics in Rio de Janeiro, in the men's 90 kg. He was defeated in the round of 32 by Tiago Camilo of Brazil.

References

External links
 

1991 births
Living people
South African male judoka
Olympic judoka of South Africa
Judoka at the 2016 Summer Olympics
Commonwealth Games medallists in judo
Commonwealth Games gold medallists for South Africa
Judoka at the 2014 Commonwealth Games
African Games medalists in judo
Competitors at the 2015 African Games
African Games bronze medalists for South Africa
Medallists at the 2014 Commonwealth Games